Edward Linta (born 1932) is a former American football coach.  He was the 28th head football coach at Washburn University in Topeka, Kansas, serving for two seasons, from 1965 to 1966, and compiling a record of 4–13–1.  Linta played college football as an end at Kansas State University from 1952 to 1954. before coming to Washburn as an assistant in 1964, he was the head football coach at Eastern Arizona Junior College—now known as Eastern Arizona College—in 1963 and was an assistant football coach at the University of Arizona from 1959 to 1961 and the University of Wyoming in 1962.

Head coaching record

College

References

1932 births
Living people
American football ends
Arizona Wildcats football coaches
Kansas State Wildcats football players
Washburn Ichabods football coaches
Wyoming Cowboys football coaches
Junior college football coaches in the United States